Patrick Henry Diamond is an American theoretical plasma physicist. He is currently a professor at the University of California, San Diego, and a director of the Fusion Theory Institute at the National Fusion Research Institute in Daejeon, South Korea, where the KSTAR Tokamak is operated.

In 2011, Diamond was jointly awarded the Hannes Alfvén Prize with Akira Hasegawa and Kunioki Mima for important contributions to the theory of turbulent transport in plasmas. In addition to applications in controlled nuclear fusion, he also specializes in astrophysical plasmas.

Early life and career 
Diamond received his Ph.D. in 1979 from the Massachusetts Institute of Technology.

Patrick Diamond is very fond of cats, and currently has one cat, Geronimo.

Honors and awards 
In 1986, he was inducted a fellow of the American Physical Society. In 1988, he became a Sloan Research Fellow.

In 2011, Diamond was awarded the Hannes Alfvén Prize by the European Physical Society for "laying the foundations of modern numerical transport simulations and key contributions on self-generated zonal flows and flow shear decorrelation mechanisms which form the basis of modern turbulence in plasmas".

Publications

References 

American plasma physicists
Fellows of the American Physical Society
Living people
Plasma physicists
Massachusetts Institute of Technology alumni
Sloan Research Fellows
Year of birth missing (living people)